Markward von Annweiler (died 1202) was Imperial Seneschal and Regent of the Kingdom of Sicily.

Biography
Markward was a ministerialis, that is, he came not from the free nobility, but from a class of unfree knights and administrators whose purpose was to serve loyally the Imperial administration in any capacity. During the reign of the Emperor Frederick Barbarossa, Markward became one of the most important figures in the administration.

Markward can be proved at the latest since the Diet of Pentecost.  From 1184, Markward served Barbarossa's son Henry VI in Italy. Henry appointed him Margrave of Ancona and Count of Abruzzo, placing him in a highly strategic position in north-central Italy. After the death of Henry, Markward at first supported his widow Constance of Sicily, but later found himself her enemy. He had been excommunicated by Popes Celestine III and Innocent III, who were trying to take over lands in central Italy.

Markward stayed in Italy, and became a supporter of Philip of Swabia, the brother of Henry. Markward's political and military activities caused great problems for the Popes, whose control of Sicily gradually weakened. Two years after Constance's death (1198), Philip gave Markward the lordship of Palermo, where the under-age heir, the future Emperor Frederick II, was resident. Despite the opposition of Innocent III, Markward became Guardian of Frederick II and Regent of Sicily. However, Markward died within a few years.  Markward died at a town called Patti having succumbed to surgery for kidney stones.

He was succeeded in Palermo by William of Capparone.

Further reading

 David Abulafia, 1988. Frederick II: A Medieval Emperor (Oxford University Press)
Wolff, Robert L. and Hazard, H. W., A History of the Crusades: Volume Two, The Later Crusades 1187-1311, The University of Wisconsin Press, Madison, 1977, pp. 344–349, 749
Riley-Smith, Jonathan, The Crusades:  A History, Yale University Press, 1987, pp. 162–163.

References

1202 deaths
People excommunicated by the Catholic Church
Year of birth unknown
Christians of the Third Crusade
Ministeriales